Valentin Vladimirovich Morkov (born 21 April 1971) is a Russian professional football coach and a former player. He also holds Moldovan citizenship. He is an assistant manager with FC Sakhalin Yuzhno-Sakhalinsk.

External links
 

1971 births
Living people
Russian footballers
Association football goalkeepers
FC Zimbru Chișinău players
FC Sakhalin Yuzhno-Sakhalinsk players
Moldovan Super Liga players
Kazakhstan Premier League players
Expatriate footballers in Kazakhstan
Russian expatriate sportspeople in Kazakhstan